Theologia mythologica is a 1532 book by Georg Pictorius. It was one of the first treatises of Classical mythology in the German Renaissance. Pictorius interprets the Greek pantheon as allegory, e.g. Cybele as the Earth, her chariot wheels as symbolizing the rotation of the Earth.

Editions
Theologia mythologica ex doctiss. uirorum promptuario, labore Pictorij Vill. in compendium congesta. : Videlicet De nominum deorum gentilium ratione. De imaginibus, aut formis, insignibusque eorundem et omnium imaginum explanationes allegoricæ, Antwerp, Michiel Hillen van Hoochstraten (1532)
Theologia mythologica : videlicet de nominum deorum gentilium ratione, de imaginibus aut formis, insignibusque eorundem, et omnium imaginum explanationes allegoricae, Franeker, J. Horreus (1696).

References
Peter S. Hawkins, From Mythography to Myth-Making: Spenser and the Magna Mater Cybele, Sixteenth Century Journal, (1981).
Rachel Darmon : "Georgius Pictorius à la recherche d'un langage mythographique", in Acta Conventus Neo-latini Uppsaliensis. Proceedings of the fourteenth International Congress of Neo-latin Studies, Uppsala, 2009, dir. Astrid Steiner-Weber, Brill, 2012, p. 341-351.
Rachel Darmon : « La mythographie comme écriture de la variatio : métamorphoses poétiques de l’unité divine au XVIe siècle », in La variatio. L’aventure d’un principe d’écriture, de l’Antiquité au XXIe siècle. Actes du colloque tenu à l’Université de Clermont-Ferrand, 25-27 mars 2010, dir. Hélène Vial, Paris, Classiques Garnier, 2014, p. 429-439.
Rachel Darmon : « Figuration, fable et théologie dans les traités de mythographie », in Fable/ Figure. Récit, fiction, allégorisation à la Renaissance, dir. Trung Tran, RHR : Revue de l’association d’études sur la Renaissance, l’Humanisme et la Réforme, n° 77, Lyon, décembre 2013, p. 31-50.

1532 books
Mythology books
Mythography
References on Greek mythology